The Southwestern Michigan Athletic Conference (also known as the SMAC or the Big 16) is a high school athletic conference in Southwestern Michigan. It is composed of Class A schools from the MHSAA in Berrien, Calhoun, Kalamazoo, and Van Buren counties.

Membership

Current members

Membership Timeline (since 1931)

History 
Early Days (1931)

The Southwest Michigan Athletic Conference was formed in 1931, consisting of St. Joseph, Niles, Dowagiac, Three Rivers, and South Haven.  St. Joseph left in 1938 and then reappeared back in 1940.  The official name of the conference has always been the Southwest Michigan Athletic Conference, but it had mostly been referred to as the "Big" followed by the number of schools in the league (such as Big 5, Big 6, Big 8, Big 16). However, the conference is now just known as the SMAC.

The 1970s

The league made its first big change in 1977 (then known as the Big 8) as (Battle Creek Lakeview, Holland, Loy Norrix, Niles, Portage Central, Portage Northern, and St. Joseph) and Independent Kalamazoo Central made up the membership of the conference. Portage Central won the first football title (7-0) and advanced to the Class A State Final, losing to Birmingham Brother Rice 17-7. Not everyone played all seven games in the league for football (Niles only played five and Battle Creek Lakeview and Portage Northern played six). Everyone played a full league schedule for football in 1978. Portage Central also won the first Boys Basketball league title (11-3, lost to conference foe Loy Norrix in districts). This original alignment stayed until 1984-85.
There were some changes in store for the 1985-86 season. Battle Creek Lakeview and Holland left the conference to join other leagues. Lakeview rejoined the Twin Valley (which they would stay until the league folded) and Holland left to join the Ottawa-Kent Conference (currently playing in). With those schools gone, Independent Battle Creek Central and former Lake Michigan Conference member Benton Harbor. This lasted for several years (until 2000-01).

Big Changes

There was some talk in 2000 that the conference was going to expand into a super-conference. The longtime Twin Valley Athletic Association (at the time was the oldest conference in the State of Michigan) was going into peril as Albion, Hillsdale, and Parma Western wanted out of the conference due to several factors, mainly declining enrollment (Battle Creek Lakeview was a Class A and Albion was a Class C school) and performance athletically (the three above mentioned were in the bottom of the league as the bigger schools dominated the league). Independents Dowagiac and Stevensville-Lakeshore were struggling to find opponents (both schools were scheduling out-of-state opponents; Lakeshore played Rock Island, Illinois for one of their football games), and Mattawan's enrollment had outgrown the Kalamazoo Valley Athletic Association.
The expansion was approved and would start for the 2001 football season. But, there were several problems about this new "super-conference". Travel, strength of programs, and tradition were some of the problems that arose. Despite the problems, the new league added on five schools from the dissolved Twin Valley (Battle Creek Harper Creek, Battle Creek Lakeview, Coldwater, Marshall, and Sturgis; which made up the East Division), Mattawan from the Kalamazoo Valley, and Independents Dowagiac and Stevensville-Lakeshore. The league was split into three divisions listed below.

Problems and Change

Already problems arose. East-West crossovers were at least 90 minutes to two hours away (teams would get home till close to midnight on school nights), the Central Division schools were bullying on some of the smaller East/West Division schools (especially true for Dowagiac, which was the smallest school in the conference). 
In 2006-07, Dowagiac left the league to join the Wolverine Conference (along with Paw Paw, who also outgrew the Kalamazoo Valley). Also that year, Jackson Lumen Christi join the league for football only to make the league an even 16 teams (without Lumen Christi, one team in the league would have to go outside the conference every week). Lumen Christi played in the West Division for that season to replace Dowagiac's schedule (realigned to the East Division in 2007-08). With Dowagiac moving out of the SMAC, Mattawan moved to the West Division for the 2006-07 season to make three divisions of five teams each (didn't move to West in football until 2007-08 season). For the 2009 Football season (mainly due to cut down on travel), the league will go to two divisions as Battle Creek Central and Kalamazoo Central will move to the East Division and the remaining teams in the Central will go to the West Division.   The league slightly realigned again in 2009 when Kalamazoo Loy Norrix moved from the Western to Eastern Division and Kalamazoo Central moved into the West Division.  Even with Kalamazoo Central's two main rivals in the opposite division in football, the league allowed KC to keep playing Loy Norrix and Battle Creek Central during the first two weeks of the season.  Kalamazoo Central's schedule does not allow them to play any games against the other schools in the Eastern Division.  In other sports, the teams play each other, but as non conference games, with the boys basketball contest usually contested at Western Michigan University.

The leagues membership reduced to 12 after the 2013-14 school year as Coldwater, Harper Creek, Marshall, and Sturgis are set to leave the SMAC for different conferences in time for the 2014-15 school year.  Sturgis is set to move to the Wolverine Conference while Coldwater, Harper Creek, and Marshall are set to form a league in the Jackson area.

Benton Harbor left the league in 2015-2016.

One divisional alignment change starting for the 2018-19 season has Mattawan switching from the East Division to the West Division.

After the 2019-20 school year, founding member Niles will leave the SMAC after 89 years, joining the BCS Conference beginning in 2020-21. Also, Loy Norrix will leave the SMAC in football only, remaining a member in all other sports.

Current Alignment

References

Michigan high school sports conferences